Golden Power may refer to:

 "Golden Powers" (Kröd Mändoon episode), the second episode of the first season of the comedic sword and sorcery series Kröd Mändoon and the Flaming Sword of Fire
 A Norwegian-produced sparkling fruit wine from Vinmonopolet selection that was discontinued 2006
 Golden Power Group, a battery manufacturer stationed in Hong Kong